The Lioré et Olivier LeO 20 was a French night-bomber aircraft built by Lioré et Olivier.

Development 
The LeO 20 was a development of the LeO 122 prototype.  It won the 1926 French ministry competition for a new night-bomber, and received an order for 50 aircraft. The first were delivered at the end of 1926 and flight tested at Villacoublay in 1927.  A total of 311 aircraft were delivered to the French air arm, ending in December 1932.

Variants 
LeO 20twin-engine night bomber with Gnome-Rhône 9Ady engines (320 built)
LeO 201re-designation for parachute trainers converted from LeO 20
LeO 203four-engine version with Gnome-Rhône 7Kb engines
LeO H-20/4floatplane version of LeO 203
LeO 206production version of LeO 203 with revised nose, ventral "balcony" and tail gun (37 built)
LeO 207similar to LeO 206 but with different nose and smaller "balcony" (3 built)
LeO 208similar to LeO 20 but with enclosed cabin and Gnome-Rhône 14Mrs engines

Operators/Units using this aircraft

French Air Force
21st Regiments d'Aviation
22nd Regiments d'Aviation
12th Regiments d'Aviation
34th Regiments d'Aviation
Aeronautique Militaire School
French Navy

Royal Romanian Air Force

Specifications (LeO 20)

See also

References 

1920s French bomber aircraft
20
Biplanes
Twin piston-engined tractor aircraft
Aircraft first flown in 1927